SPTV may refer to:
Space Power TV
Sony Pictures Television